Higher Kinnerton is a village and community within rural Flintshire, Wales, close to the Wales-England border. Its sister village, Lower Kinnerton, is across the border in Cheshire, England.

In the 2001 census it had a population of 1,634, increasing to 1,697 at the 2011 census.

Amenities
The village has a shop, and two public houses, The Swan and The Royal Oak. The parish church is All Saints, which is actually in the parish of Dodleston, England. There is a Scout group called 1st Kinnerton Scouts. The Village Hall hosts various community clubs and events.

Higher Kinnerton has a progressive community council which supports local activities. The village was awarded Best Kept Community status by Flintshire County Council in 2012, 2014, 2017 and 2019.

A planning application for 95 homes to the west of the village was refused on 3 March 2021. The land, adjacent to Kinnerton Meadows and several listed buildings, is believed to have historical significance as falling partly within the site of the medieval Llwydcoed Royal Park.

Education
The village has a primary school, Ysgol Derwen. The local secondary schools are Castell Alun, located in Hope and Hawarden High School in Hawarden.

Governance
The area is an electoral ward for Flintshire County Council, coterminous with the community, which elects one county councillor.

See also
All Saints Church, Higher Kinnerton
Kinnerton railway station

References

External links 

Photos of Higher Kinnerton and surrounding area on geograph.org.uk
Higher Kinnerton Community Council website

Villages in Flintshire
Communities in Flintshire
Wards of Flintshire